In Canada, an Indian reserve is specified by the Indian Act as a "tract of land, the legal title to which is vested in Her Majesty,
that has been set apart by Her Majesty for the use and benefit of a band."
Indian reserves are the areas set aside for First Nations, an indigenous Canadian group, after a contract with the Canadian state ("the Crown"), and are not to be confused with land claims areas, which involve all of that First Nations' traditional lands: a much larger territory than any reserve.

Demographics 
A single "band" (First Nations government) may control one reserve or several, while other reserves are shared between multiple bands. In 2003, the Department of Indian and Northern Affairs stated there were 2,300 reserves in Canada, comprising .  According to Statistics Canada in 2011, there are more than 600 First Nations/Indian bands in Canada and 3,100 Indian reserves across Canada. Examples include the Driftpile First Nation, which like many bands, has only one reserve, Driftpile River 150. The Bear River First Nation, who govern Bear River 6, Bear River 6A and Bear River 6B, are one of many examples where a single government is responsible for more than one reserve.

In 2003, 60 percent of status Indians lived on reserves. Of the 637,660 First Nations people who reported being Registered Indians, nearly one-half (49.3%) lived on an Indian reserve. This proportion varies across the country.

Many reserves have no resident population; typically they are small, remote, non-contiguous pieces of land, a fact which has led many to be abandoned, or used only seasonally (as a trapping territory, for example). Statistics Canada counts only those reserves which are populated (or potentially populated) as "subdivisions" for the purpose of the national census. For the 2011 census, of the more than 3,100 Indian reserves across Canada, there were only 961 Indian reserves classified as census subdivisions (including the six reserves added for 2011). Some reserves that were originally rural were gradually surrounded by urban development. Montreal, Vancouver and Calgary are examples of cities with urban Indian reserves.

Governance 
One band Chief and Council commonly administer more than one reserve, such as the Beaver Lake Cree Nation with two reserves or the Lenape people (in Canada incorporated as the Munsee-Delaware Nation), who occupy Munsee-Delaware Nation Indian Reserve No. 1. This consists of three non-contiguous parcels of land totalling  within the Chippewas of the Thames First Nation 42 near Muncey, Ontario, which was formerly shared between them and the Chippewas of the Thames First Nation as a single parcel of land. Some reserves are shared by multiple bands, whether as fishing camps or educational facilities such as Pekw'Xe:yles, a reserve on the Fraser River used by 21 Indian bands that was formerly St. Mary's Indian Residential School and is an example of a reserve created in modern times. Another multi-band reserve of the Sto:lo peoples is Grass Indian Reserve No. 15, which is located in the City of Chilliwack and is shared by nine bands.

Treaties and reserves, 1763–1867 
After the Royal Proclamation of 1763 but before Confederation in 1867, the Upper Canada Treaties (1764–1862 Ontario) and the Douglas Treaties (1850–1854 British Columbia) were signed. "Some of these pre-confederation and post-confederation treaties addressed reserve lands, hunting, fishing, trapping rights, annuities and other benefits."  Governor James Douglas of British Columbia, which formally became a colony in 1858, also worked to establish many reserves on the mainland during his tenure, though most of these were overturned by successor colonial governments and later royal commissions once the province joined Confederation in 1871.

Constitution Act 1867 
In 1867, legislative jurisdiction over "Indians and Lands reserved for the Indians" was assigned to the Parliament of Canada through the Constitution Act, 1867, a major part of Canada's Constitution (originally known as the British North America Act), which acknowledged that First Nations had special status. Separate powers covered "status and civil rights on the one hand and Indian lands on the other."

In 1870, the newly formed Dominion government acquired Rupert's Land, a vast territory in British North America consisting mostly of the Hudson Bay drainage basin that had been controlled by the Hudson's Bay Company under its Charter with the British Crown from 1670 to 1870. Numerous aboriginal groups lived in the same territory and disputed the sovereignty of the area. The Dominion of Canada promised Britain to honour the provisions of the Royal Proclamation of 1763 to "negotiate with its Amerindians for the extinguishment of their title and the setting aside of reserves for their exclusive use." This promise led to the Numbered Treaties.

Numbered treaties, 1871–1921 
Between 1871 and 1921, through Numbered Treaties with First Nations, the Canadian government gained large areas of land for settlers and for industry in Northwestern Ontario, Northern Canada and in the Prairies. The treaties were also called the Land Cession or Post-Confederation Treaties. Treaty 1 was a controversial agreement established August 3, 1871, between Queen Victoria and various First Nations in southeastern Manitoba, including the Anishinaabe and the Swampy Cree tribes. Treaty 1 First Nations comprise the Brokenhead Ojibway Nation, Fort Alexander (Sagkeeng First Nation), Long Plain First Nation, Peguis First Nation, Roseau River Anishinabe First Nation, Sandy Bay First Nation and Swan Lake First Nation.

The Indian Act 1876 
The rights and freedoms of Canada's First Nations people have been governed by the Indian Act since its enactment in 1876 by the Parliament of Canada. The provisions of Section 91(24) of the Constitution Act, 1867, provided Canada's federal government exclusive authority to legislate in relation to "Indians and Lands Reserved for Indians".

Wikwemikong Unceded Reserve on Manitoulin Island is subject to the Indian Act provisions governing reserves even though its lands were never ceded to the Crown by treaty.

Indian Act 
The Indian Act gives the Minister of Crown–Indigenous Relations the right to "determine whether any purpose for which lands in a reserve are used is for the use and benefit of the band." Title to land within the reserve may be transferred to only the band or to individual band members. Reserve lands may not be seized legally, nor is the personal property of a  band or a band member living on a reserve subject to "charge, pledge, mortgage, attachment, levy, seizure distress or execution in favour or at the instance of any person other than an Indian or a band".

Housing loans 
While the act was intended to protect the Indian holdings, the limitations make it difficult for the reserves and their residents to obtain financing for development and construction, or renovation. To answer this need, Canada Mortgage and Housing Corporation (CMHC) has created an on-reserve housing loan program. Members of bands may enter into a trust agreement with CMHC, and lenders can receive loans to build or repair houses. In other programs, loans to residents of reserves are guaranteed by the federal government.

Provinces and municipalities may expropriate reserve land if specifically authorized by a provincial or federal law. Few reserves have any economic advantages, such as resource revenues. The revenues of those reserves that do are held in trust by the minister of Crown–Indigenous Relations and Northern Affairs Canada. Reserve lands and the personal property of bands and resident band members are exempt from all forms of taxation except local taxation.

Corporations owned by members of First Nations are not exempt, however. This exemption has allowed band members operating in proprietorships or partnerships to sell heavily taxed goods, such as cigarettes, on their reserves at prices considerably lower than those at stores off the reserves. Most reserves are self-governed, within the limits already described, under guidelines established by the Indian Act.

Due to treaty settlements, some Indian reserves are now incorporated as villages, such as Gitlaxt'aamiks, British Columbia, which like other Nisga'a reserves was relieved of that status by the Nisga'a Treaty. Similarly, the Indian reserves of the Sechelt Indian Band are now Indian government districts.

Public policy 
Indian reserves play a very important role in public policy stakeholder consultations, particularly when reserves are located in areas that have valuable natural resources with potential for economic development. Beginning in the 1970s, First Nations gained "recognition of their constitutionally protected rights." First Nations' rights are protected by section 35 of the Constitution Act, 1982. By 2002, (Valiente) First Nations had already "finalised 14 comprehensive land claims and self-government agreements, with numerous others, primarily in northern Canada and British Columbia, at different stages of negotiations." Land claims and self-government agreements are "modern treaties" and therefore hold constitutional status.

CEPA 1999 
The Canadian Environmental Protection Act, 1999 (CEPA), "places aboriginal participation on par with federal ministers and the provinces in the National Advisory Committee." Among other things, CEPA clarified the term "aboriginal land" in 3 (1): "The definitions in this subsection apply in this Act. "aboriginal land" means (a) reserves, surrendered lands and any other lands that are set apart for the use and benefit of a band and that are subject to the Indian Act." Under sections 46–50 of the CEPA, Environment and Climate Change Canada's National Pollutant Release Inventory (NPRI) was initiated. NPRI is the inventory of "pollutants released, disposed of and sent for recycling by facilities across the country". The NPRI is used by First Nation administrations on reserves, along with other research tools, to monitor pollution. For example, NPRI data showed the Aamjiwnaang First Nation in Sarnia, Ontario, was "ground zero for Ontario's heaviest load of air pollution."

Water quality 

By December 21, 2017, there were 67 long-term boil-water advisories that had been in effect for longer than a year. These are "public water systems managed by the federal government". There were also 18 communities that had "water issues for between two and 12 months."

According to statistics gathered by Health Canada and the First Nations Health Authority, in 2015, there were "162 drinking water advisories in 118 First Nation communities". In October 2015, Neskantaga First Nation reported that its "20-year boil-water advisory" was "the longest running drinking water advisory in Canada." Shoal Lake 40 First Nation was under an 18-year boil water advisory.

By 2006, nearly 100 Indian reserves had boil-water advisories and many others had substandard water. Ḵwiḵwa̱sut'inux̱w Ha̱xwa'mis First Nation, on Vancouver Island, had a boil-water advisory beginning in 1997. In October 2005, "high E. coli levels were found in the Kashechewan First Nation reserve's drinking water and chlorine levels had to be increased to 'shock' levels, causing skin problems and eventually resulting in an evacuation of hundreds of people from the reserve and costing approximately $16 million."

See also
 Aboriginal land title in Canada
 Block settlement
 Indian reservation (United States)
 Indigenous specific land claims in Canada
 Lands inhabited by indigenous peoples
 List of Indian reserves in Canada by population
 Monarchy of Canada and the Indigenous peoples of Canada

Notes and references

Notes

References

Citations

General references

Further reading 
 This series provides data on individual reserves including population by Aboriginal identity, immigrant population, educational attainment, labour, income and housing. In the documents footnote it was pointed out that, "[r]espondents self-identified as 'First Nations (North American Indian)' on the NHS questionnaire; however, the term 'First Nations people' is used throughout this document." In the document, "term 'Aboriginal identity' refers to whether the person reported being an Aboriginal person, that is, First Nations (North American Indian), Métis or Inuk (Inuit) and/or being a Registered or Treaty Indian, (that is, registered under the Indian Act of Canada) and/or being a member of a First Nation or Indian band. Aboriginal peoples of Canada are defined in the Constitution Act, 1982, section 35 (2) as including the Indian, Inuit and Métis peoples of Canada."

External links 

1871 treaties
 
Local government in Canada
Numbered Treaties